Krasny Ugol is a rural locality (a village) in Filippovskoye Rural Settlement, Kirzhachsky District, Vladimir Oblast, Russia. The population was 8 as of 2010. There are 3 streets.

Geography 
Krasny Ugol is located 33 km southwest of Kirzhach (the district's administrative centre) by road. Zemlyanki is the nearest rural locality.

References 

Rural localities in Kirzhachsky District